Vladimir Valentinovich Fedotov (born 12 August 1966) is a Russian professional football coach and a former player. He is the manager of PFC CSKA Moscow.

Club career
He made his professional debut in the Soviet Second League in 1983 for FC Uralmash Sverdlovsk. Fedotov played in 125 Russian Top League matches before he scored his first goal (for Uralmash in May 1996).

He played 6 games in the UEFA Intertoto Cup 1996 for FC Uralmash Yekaterinburg.

Coaching career
On 8 December 2019, he was appointed manager of Russian Premier League club PFC Sochi. In the 2020–21 Russian Premier League, he led Sochi to 5th place, qualifying for European competition (UEFA Conference League) for the first time in club's history. In the 2021–22 season, he led Sochi to the 2nd place in the league and was chosen as coach of the month by the league for May 2022.

On 15 June 2022, Fedotov signed a long-term contract to coach PFC CSKA Moscow.

References

1966 births
People from Sverdlovsk Oblast
Living people
Soviet footballers
Russian footballers
Association football midfielders
Association football defenders
Russian Premier League players
FC Ural Yekaterinburg players
FC Arsenal Tula players
FC Sokol Saratov players
Russian football managers
Russian Premier League managers
FC Ural Yekaterinburg managers
FC Orenburg managers
PFC Sochi managers
PFC CSKA Moscow managers
Sportspeople from Sverdlovsk Oblast